B4347 road is a road in Monmouthshire, south-eastern Wales, and crosses the border into Herefordshire, England. It passes through the village of Skenfrith. The road crosses the River Monnow.

In its upper part the road and the B4348 are known as Golden Valley Road. Numerous notable landmarks along the road include Hilston Park, Grosmont Castle and Dore Abbey.

References

Roads in Monmouthshire
Roads in Herefordshire